Sweden held a general election around 15 September 1928.

Results

Regional results

Percentage share

By votes

Constituency results

Percentage share

By votes

Results by city and district

Blekinge

Gothenburg and Bohuslän

Bohuslän

Gothenburg

Gotland

Gävleborg

Halland

Jämtland

Jönköping

Kalmar

Kopparberg

Kristianstad

Kronoberg

Malmöhus

Malmö area

Malmöhus County

Norrbotten

Skaraborg

Stockholm

Stockholm (city)

Stockholm County
The Farmers' League and the Liberal Party ran on a joint list, with their respective totals only being reported in the final constituency tallies.

Södermanland

Uppsala

Värmland

Västerbotten

Västernorrland
The two liberal parties Free-minded National Association and the Liberal Party ran on a joint list, although their individual results were counted separately in the nationwide totals.

Västmanland

Älvsborg

Älvsborg N

Älvsborg S

Örebro

Östergötland

References

General elections in Sweden